Bucculatrix nepalica is a moth in the family Bucculatricidae. It was described by Seksjaeva Baryshnikova in 2001. It is found in the Nepal.

References

External links

Bucculatricidae
Endemic fauna of Nepal
Moths described in 2001
Moths of Asia